The Fighter Collection is a private operator of airworthy vintage military aircraft or warbirds. It is based in the United Kingdom at Duxford Aerodrome in Cambridgeshire, an airfield that is owned by the Imperial War Museum and is also the site of the Imperial War Museum Duxford. It is registered as a Private limited company.

The Fighter Collection is owned by and was founded by Stephen Grey, a businessman and former RAF pilot domiciled in Monaco. The aircraft are stored and maintained in Hangar 2 at Duxford Aerodrome; the hangar is accessible to visitors of the Imperial War Museum.

Flying Legends

Flying Legends is an annual two-day airshow, held at the beginning of July every year, organized by The Fighter Collection. The 2013 airshow saw the celebration of the event's 20th anniversary. For 2021, the event moved from its long-standing former home at Duxford Aerodrome to Sywell Aerodrome.

Aircraft
These aircraft are owned by The Fighter Collection . The operator occasionally adds new aircraft to its collection, and occasionally sells aircraft to other parties.

See also
 The Shuttleworth Collection

References

External links 

 Flying Legends Airshow
 The Fighter Collection

Aviation organisations based in the United Kingdom